Gorgone may refer to:
Gorgone, an album by a jam project featuring Buckethead, Travis Dickerson, and Pinchface.
Gorgone (moth), a genus of moth

People with the surname
Michelle Gorgone (born 1983), American snowboarder
Giorgio Gorgone (born 1975), Italian footballer

See also
 Gorgon (disambiguation)